The Thorneycroft carbine was one of the earliest bullpup rifles, developed by an English gunsmith in 1901 as patent No. 14,622 of July 18, 1901.  This bolt-action rifle featured a bullpup action in which the retracted bolt slid back through the stock nearly to the shooter's shoulder, maximising the space available in the body of the firearm.  The rifle was chambered in the contemporary .303 British (7.7 mm) service cartridge, and held five rounds in an internal magazine.

The Thorneycroft was  shorter and 10% lighter than the standard Lee–Enfield rifle used by the British military at the time.  However, when tested at Hythe the firearm exhibited excessive recoil and poor ergonomics, and was not adopted for military service.

See also
 List of bullpup firearms

Sources

 The Lee-Enfield Story.  Ian Skennerton. page 89.

External links
 - MilitaryImages.Net - Thorneycroft carbine
 - MilitaryImages.Net - Thorneycroft carbine
 - Youtube video of an example at the Royal Armouries, Leeds

Bolt-action rifles of the United Kingdom
Bullpup rifles
Trial and research firearms of the United Kingdom